St Crux is a parish hall in York, in England, which incorporates the remains of a Mediaeval church.

History
The building is on Pavement, although it is entered from The Shambles, while it backs onto Whip-Ma-Whop-Ma-Gate.

St Crux was first mentioned in the Domesday Book, at which time it belonged to the Count of Mortain, later passing to St Mary's Abbey.  The church was rebuilt between 1402 and 1424, incorporating a Saxon carved stone into the north wall.  The tower was rebuilt from 1697, and Francis Drake described the Italianate tower as "a handsome new steeple of brick coined with stone".  Although the church was regarded as one of the finest in the city, by the 19th-century, it was in a poor condition, and it was closed in 1880; the parish was soon merged into that of All Saints' Church.  Fisher and Hepper drew up plans in 1884 to restore the church, but it was instead demolished three years later, over the objections of the Society for the Protection of Ancient Buildings.  Despite the poor condition of the tower, it proved sturdy enough that it had to be dynamited.The Press has described it as "perhaps the most famous" lost church of York.

In 1888, a parish hall was built on the site of St Crux, reusing materials from the church, including much of its north wall, and the Perpendicular east window.  Inside are many of the monuments and fixtures from the former church.  Burials include Thomas Percy, 7th Earl of Northumberland, Sir Thomas Herbert, and two Lord Mayors of York: Thomas Bowes and Robert Welles.

The building was grade II* listed in 1954.  It is used as a tea room, and for charity markets.

References

Crux
Grade II* listed churches in York
Buildings and structures completed in 1888